Juan Pablo Francia (born 3 December 1984 in San Francisco, Córdoba) is an Argentine football playmaker who plays for Sportivo Belgrano. He is best known for his passing and eye for goal.

Career
Francia played his first games for Sportivo Belgrano in the regional leagues in Córdoba. He was spotted by French outfit Bordeaux, he joined the club and worked his way through the youth team making his competitive debut in a 2-1 defeat by Nantes on the last day of the 2001-2002 season, on 5 May 2002.

References

External links

1984 births
Argentine footballers
Association football forwards
Argentine expatriate footballers
FC Girondins de Bordeaux players
Sportivo Belgrano footballers
Talleres de Córdoba footballers
Ligue 1 players
Primera Nacional players
Torneo Federal A players
Living people
Argentine expatriate sportspeople in France
Expatriate footballers in France
People from San Francisco, Córdoba
Sportspeople from Córdoba Province, Argentina